The Amazing Race: A Corrida Milionária was a Brazilian adventure reality game show based on the international Amazing Race franchise. Following the premise of other versions of the format, the show follows eleven teams of two as they race across Brazil and Chile. The show was split into legs, with teams tasked to deduce clues, navigate themselves in foreign areas, interact with locals, perform physical and mental challenges, and travel by air, boat, car, taxi, and other modes of transport. Teams are progressively eliminated at the end of most legs for being the last to arrive at designated Pit Stops. The first team to arrive at the Finish Line wins a grand prize of R$500,000 BRL.

The show was hosted by Rony Curvelo and independently produced and aired in a purchased time slot in the Brazilian television network RedeTV!. It premiered on 13 October 2007 and ended on 5 January 2008.

Friends Patricia & Sane were the winners.

Production

Development and filming

The Amazing Race: A Corrida Milionária covered  in 33 days. The season was filmed mostly in Brazil while it traveled outside to Chile for final two legs, resulting in the fewest countries visited in an Amazing Race franchise until The Amazing Race: China Rush.

The series adopted the rules from the American version's tenth and eleventh seasons. With the exception of the Intersection, all clue types were retained in the Brazilian version, as well as the non-elimination penalty. This show also differed from the original format in that while teams leave the Pit Stops in the same order they arrived, the time differences were not always respected. The penalty for not completing a Roadblock was also shorter at three hours compared to four. Route markers are colored yellow and green, reflecting the Brazilian national colours, as opposed to yellow and red in most other versions. Also, contrary to other Amazing Race versions, the eliminated teams did not make an appearance at the Finish Line. Additionally, this is the first Amazing Race franchise whereby they did not end in the same country as it started as the season started in Brazil and ended in Chile. In most versions, the seasons start and end in same country.

Notably, in Leg 6, while driving to the Pit Stop, Andréa & Luciana were held up at gunpoint by three men at a stoplight in Fortaleza. The team did not lose anything, but the criminals took the camera and all personal documents from the crew, and ran off as gunshots were fired by the police. Two of the men were later caught and identified, and the camera was recovered. This incident dropped the team from 4th to last place, and no time credit was given for the situation. Part of the robbery was filmed and shown in the sixth episode. In Leg 13, Perri & Maristela became the first team to quit the show in a final leg, after refusing to perform the first task.

Cast
Applications for the first season were open from January until July 2007, and filming occurred in South America during August and September. Narciso & Marcelo are the first openly gay couple to participate in a Brazilian reality show. While Eduardo previously participated in the Brazilian reality game show Sem Saída, in which he won R$50,000.

Results
The following teams participated in the season, with their relationships at the time of filming. Placements are listed in finishing order:

Key
A  team placement indicates that the team was eliminated.
An  team placement indicates that the team came in last on a non-elimination leg and was "marked for elimination"; if the team did not finish 1st on the next leg, they would receive a 30-minute penalty.
A  indicates that the team won a Fast Forward.
A  indicates that the team chose to use the Yield;  indicates the team who received it;  around the leg number indicates that the Yield for that leg was available but not used.

Notes

 For unknown reasons on the subsequent leg, the starting placements of Jorge & Silvia and Milene & Jaqueline were switched, resulting in Jorge & Silvia and Milene & Jaqueline starting in 5th and 4th place. respectively.
 Jonatas & Rafael were issued a 25-minute penalty on site while on the way to the Pit Stop because their taxi driver was speeding.
 In Leg 3, all teams (except Carlos & Eduardo, who took the Fast Forward) were issued 30-minute penalty as they completed the Roadblock with their partners. Each of the performance in the Roadblock is not counted towards the tally.
^ Jorge & Sílvia and Milene & Jaqueline initially arrived 4th and 5th, respectively, but both teams were issued 25-minute penalties as both teams took an illegal shortcut by driving in the wrong direction on a one-way street. They served their penalties at the start of Leg 6, and departed in 5th and 6th, respectively.
 Andréa & Luciana and their film crew were robbed at gunpoint during the leg. By the time the film crew recovered their belongings and were allowed to continue racing, they dropped to last place; however, they were not eliminated as Rony notified that this leg was non-elimination.
 Andréa & Luciana initially arrived 5th, but were issued a 30-minute penalty for being "marked for elimination" and not arriving 1st. Patrícia & Sane checked in during their penalty time, dropping Andréa & Luciana to 6th.
^ Sane, Jonatas, Maristela and Débora decided to forfeit the Roadblock at Leg 10; their teams were all issued 3-hour penalties at the Roadblock site starting from the arrival of the next team.
 Débora & Daniela had been "marked for elimination". However, since they arrived last, they were eliminated without being assessed the 30-minute penalty.
 Jorge & Sílvia arrived 3rd, but were issued a 30-minute penalty for being "marked for elimination" and not arriving 1st. Jonatas & Rafael checked in during their penalty time, dropping Jorge & Sílvia to last place and resulting in their elimination.
 Perri & Maristela were disqualified midway during the final leg after quitting the clam eating task.

Prizes
Leg 1 – A holiday to Buenos Aires, Argentina.
Leg 2 – A holiday to Salvador, Bahia.
Leg 3 – A holiday to Natal, Rio Grande do Norte.
Leg 4 – A holiday to Rio de Janeiro.
Leg 5 – A holiday to Angra dos Reis, Rio de Janeiro.
Leg 6 – A holiday to Salvador, Bahia.
Leg 7 – A holiday to Curitiba, Paraná.
Leg 8 – A holiday to Curitiba, Paraná.
Leg 9 – A holiday to Recife, Pernambuco.
Leg 10 – A holiday to Buenos Aires, Argentina.
Leg 11 – A holiday to Rio de Janeiro.
Leg 12 – A holiday to Machu Picchu, Peru.
Leg 13 – R$500,000 BRL.

Race summary

Leg 1 (São Paulo → Rio de Janeiro)

Airdate: October 13, 2007
São Paulo, São Paulo, Brazil (Ibirapuera Park) (Starting Line)
 São Paulo (São Paulo–Congonhas Airport) to Rio de Janeiro, Rio de Janeiro (Santos Dumont Airport)
Rio de Janeiro (Morro da Urca)
 Rio de Janeiro (Morro da Urca or Santa Teresa)
Rio de Janeiro (Corcovado)
Rio de Janeiro (Praça XV)
 Guanabara Bay (Rio de Janeiro-Niterói Ferry)
Petrópolis (Palácio Quitandinha)
Petrópolis (Palácio de Cristal )
Petrópolis (Pousada da Alcobaça)  

This series' first Detour was a choice between Aventurar (Adventure) or Procurar (Search). In Aventurar, teams rappeled down Morro da Urca to receive their next clue. In Procurar, teams had to ride a tram to the historical district of Santa Teresa, find Laurinda Santos Lobo Cultural Center and retrieve their next clue from a man outside that building.

In this series' first Roadblock, one team member had to correctly identify with signs five specific vegetables patches amongst dozens in the garden to receive their next clue.

Additional task
In the ferry, teams had to search among hundreds of passengers for someone named Shimiko, without knowing their gender, ethnicity or age, who would hand them their next clue.

Leg 2 (Rio de Janeiro → Minas Gerais)

Airdate: October 20, 2007
Petrópolis (Shopping Plaza)
Ouro Preto, Minas Gerais (Praça Tiradentes )
Ouro Preto (Museu da Inconfidência)
Ouro Preto (Mina de Santa Rita) 
Mariana (Train Station)
Mariana (Mina da Passagem ) 
Santa Bárbara (Santuário do Caraça – Igreja Nossa Senhora Mãe dos Homens ) 

In this leg's Roadblock, one team member had to climb down deep into the mine and use the tools provided to dig a gold nugget to receive their next clue.

This leg's Detour was a choice between Atar (Tie) or Desviar (Dodge). In Atar, teams had to tie six kinds of knots following a demonstration to receive their next clue. In Desviar, both team members had to run through a paintball field and retrieve a flag from the other side without being hit by the shots fired to receive their next clue.

Additional task
Teams had to acquire 14 flowers in the city to lay one for each martyr of the Inconfidência Mineira buried in the museum.

Leg 3 (Minas Gerais → Bahia)

Airdate: October 27, 2007
 Belo Horizonte (Tancredo Neves International Airport) to Salvador, Bahia (Deputado Luís Eduardo Magalhães International Airport)
Salvador (Largo do Pelourinho )
Salvador (Terreiro de Candomblé Tira-Teima) 
Salvador (Mercado Modelo and Praça da Sé ) 
Salvador (Farol da Barra )
Salvador (Praça 15 de Novembro) 
 Salvador (Filhos de Ghandy Cultural Center or Largo de Santo Antônio)
Salvador (Convento do Carmo ) 

For this series' first Fast Forward, one team had to take part in a Candomblé ritual by having each member shave their heads and make a hair offering to the orishas to win the Fast Forward award.

In this leg's Roadblock, one team member to find out what were the four food items mentioned in Ary Barroso's song "No Tabuleiro da Baiana": vatapá, carurú, munguzá, and umbú. The team member had to purchase these items and present them to the baiana standing in the Praça da Sé to receive their next clue.

This leg's Detour was a choice between Vestir (Dress) or Andar (Walk). In Vestir, teams had to find the Filhos de Ghandy Cultural Center and dress a mannequin in an orisha costume, using a photograph for reference, to receive their next clue. In Andar, teams had to walk to the faraway Largo de Santo Antônio and find a capoeira circle to receive their next clue.

Leg 4 (Bahia → Alagoas)

Airdate: November 3, 2007
 Salvador (Deputado Luís Eduardo Magalhães International Airport) to Maceió, Alagoas (Zumbi dos Palmares International Airport)
Maceió (Pajuçara)
Maceió (Monumento aos Marechais)
Marechal Deodoro (Recanto do Paraíso) 
Piaçabuçu (São Francisco River Estuary)
Penedo (Igreja de Nossa Senhora da Corrente) 
Jequiá da Praia (Dunas de Marapé ) 

In this leg's Roadblock, one team member had to retrieve a clue and ten mangrove crabs from a tank.

This leg's Detour was a choice between Decifrar (Decipher) or Quebrar (Break). In Decifrar, teams had to translate a phrase from archaic Portuguese and find the monument described to receive their next clue. In Quebrar, teams had to break clay pot lids and find a small clue baked inside one of them.

Additional tasks
At Pajuçara beach, teams had to dig sand piles to find their next clue.
Before the Detour, teams had to search the entire church for a secret passageway used to hide slaves in the past to find their next clue.

Leg 5 (Alagoas → Rio Grande do Norte)

Airdate: November 10, 2007
Natal, Rio Grande do Norte (Bus Terminal)
Natal (Farol de Mãe Luiza )
Maxaranguape (Ma-Noa Park )
Parnamirim (Centro de Lançamento da Barreira do Inferno) 
Extremoz (Genipabu Dunes) 
Natal (Forte dos Reis Magos) 

In this leg's Roadblock, one team member had to assemble a small rocket, transport it and position it in a launch pad to receive their next clue.

This leg's Detour was a choice between Com Emoção (With Thrills) or Sem Emoção (Without Thrills). In Com Emoção, teams had to take a thrill ride in a dune buggy to receive their next clue. In Sem Emoção, teams had to lead a dromedary camel across a dune to receive their next clue.

Additional tasks
At Ma-Noa Park, teams had to swim among the coral reefs and find clues attached to three buoys.
Before the Roadblock, teams had to learn the proper way to address a high-ranking military official, and ask him for the clue.
After the Detour, teams had to sled down a steep dune.

Leg 6 (Rio Grande do Norte → Ceará)

Airdate: November 17, 2007
Beberibe, Ceará (Praia de Uruaú)
Beberibe (Falésias de Morro Branco)
Beberibe (Capela de São Pedro)
Fortaleza (Praia de Mucuripe) 
Fortaleza (Pier Inglês – Pirata Bar) 
Fortaleza (Centro Dragão do Mar de Arte e Cultura)
Fortaleza (Praça do Ferreira )
Fortaleza (Mercado Encetur)
Aquiraz (Wind Power Plant) 

This leg's Detour was a choice between Nadar (Swim) or Remar (Row). In Nadar, teams had to swim with a bodyboard to a raft a short distance away to receive their next clue. In Remar, teams had to kayak a longer distance to a marked sailboat to receive their next clue.

In this leg's Roadblock, one team member to climb the mast of the ship and retrieve their next clue.

Additional tasks
On their dune buggy ride to Morro Branco, teams had to collect three flags to receive their next clue. If they missed any, they had to go back and find them.
At the Falésias de Morro Branco, teams had to search among the labyrinth of sand cliffs for their next clue.

Leg 7 (Ceará → Amazonas)

Airdate: November 24, 2007
 Fortaleza (Fortaleza Airport) to Manaus, Amazonas (Eduardo Gomes International Airport)
Presidente Figueiredo (Fazenda Marupiara) 
Manaus (Teatro Amazonas)
 Manaus (Porto Ceasa  and Meeting of Waters)
Manaus (Port of Manaus) (Overnight Rest)  
 Manaus (Porto São Raimudo ) to Novo Airão (Porto de Novo Airão)
Novo Airão (Restaurante Boto-Cor-de-Rosa)
 Iranduba (Pousada Amazônia to Sateré-Mawé Tribal Village) 

This leg's Detour was a choice between Aventurar (Adventure) or Sobreviver (Survival). In Aventurar, teams had to complete a rope course in the trees, which included a rope bridge and ziplines, to receive their next clue. In Sobreviver, teams had to assemble an arapuca, an indigenous trap for catching small birds and mammals, with the materials provided to receive their next clue.

In this leg's Roadblock, one team member had to carry a  tambaqui fish to the free market to receive their next clue.

Additional tasks
At Porto Ceasa, teams had to board a marked boat that would take them out to a fishing boat on the Meeting of Waters, where they would receive their next clue and then return to Porto Ceasa.
At Restaurante Boto-Cor-de-Rosa, teams had to feed six fish to pink river dolphins to receive their next clue.
At Pousada Amazônia, teams had to paddle across the Rio Ariaú in a canoe to the Pit Stop.

Leg 8 (Amazonas → Distrito Federal)

Airdate: December 1, 2007
 Manaus (Eduardo Gomes International Airport) to Brasília, Distrito Federal (Brasília International Airport)
Brasília (Torre de TV)
Brasília (Academia de Tênis ) 
Brasília (JK Memorial)
Brasília (Bus Terminal) 
Brasília (Congresso Nacional Gardens)
 Brasília (Espaço Galleria Dance Club or Espaço Cultural Renato Russo)
Planaltina (Vale do Amanhecer Community) 

For this season's second Fast Forward, each team member from one team had to score five points against a professional tennis coach to win the Fast Forward award.

In this leg's Roadblock, one team member had to whisper a code phrase ("The sky is blue") to people in the bus terminal, until they found a someone who would reply with another phrase ("The sea is green") who would give them their next clue.

This leg's Detour was a choice between Compor (Compose) or Compositor (Composer). In Compor, teams had to go to the Espaço Galleria dance club and perform a rap incorporating the names of all of the Pit Stops visited so far on the season to the satisfaction of the crowd to receive their next clue. In Compositor, teams had to go to the Espaço Cultural Renato Russo, find a copy of the sheet music of the Brazilian National Anthem, and then listen to a pianist perform the song for them to receive their next clue.

Leg 9 (Distrito Federal → São Paulo)

Airdate: December 8, 2007
 Brasília (Brasília International Airport) to São Paulo, São Paulo (São Paulo/Guarulhos International Airport)
São Paulo (Edifício Copan Rooftop)
São Paulo (Viaduto do Chá)
Barueri (RedeTV! Studios)
Itu (Base 84) 
Itu (Kartódromo Schincariol)  
Indaiatuba (Colônia Helvétia ) 

This leg's Detour was a choice between Terra (Dirt) or Água (Water). In Terra, teams had to complete an off-road track driving a 4x4 vehicle to receive their next clue. In Água, teams had to assemble a raft using bamboo and banana tree trunks, and cross a small lake to receive their next clue.

In this leg's Roadblock, one team member had to complete ten laps in a go-kart race to receive their next clue.

Additional tasks
At the RedeTV! studios, the first team to arrive had to retrieve their clue during a live broadcast of a morning talk show. The remaining teams received their clues outside the set, off camera.
After the Detour, teams had to pitch tents to receive their next clue.

Leg 10 (São Paulo → Paraná)

Airdate: December 15, 2007
Foz do Iguaçu, Paraná (Bus Terminal)
Iguaçu National Park (Macuco Safari) 
Iguaçu National Park (Poço Preto Trail)
Iguaçu National Park (Cânion Iguaçu ) 
Iguaçu National Park (Mirante Garganta do Diabo)
Foz do Iguaçu (Paudimar Youth Hostel) 
Foz do Iguaçu (Triple Frontier Landmark) 

For this season's third Fast Forward, one team had to climb 288 steps, rappel down 55 meters, then complete a medium difficulty rafting course to win the Fast Forward award.

This leg's Detour was a choice between Subir (Climb) or Pular (Jump). In Subir, each team member had to climb a medium difficulty rock wall to receive their next clue. In Pular, each team member had to climb a 15-meter pole and jump to grab a trapeze bar while blindfolded to receive their next clue.

In this leg's Roadblock, one team member had to eat  of various meats to receive their next clue.

Additional task
At the Poço Preto trail, teams were given three bird names at random and had to find and identify them amongst pictures posted in trees throughout the trail to receive their next clue.

Leg 11 (Paraná)

Airdate: December 22, 2007
Curitiba (Jardim Botânico)
Curitiba (Opera de Arame)
Curitiba (Parque Tingui )
 Curitiba (Drop Dead Skate Park or Figaro Used Book Store)
Morretes (Railway Station)
Morretes (Santuário Nhundiaquara) 
Morretes (Metal Bridge over the Nhundiaquara River)
Paranaguá (Port of Paranaguá)
Ilha do Mel (Praia Encantada) 

This leg's Detour was a choice between Skate or Sebo (Second-Hand Bookstore). In Skate, teams had to go to Drop Dead Skate Park to assemble a skateboard and perform a medium difficulty skateboarding maneuver to receive their next clue. In Sebo, teams had to find Figaro Used Book Store and find three items among the thousands of books, records and magazines sold there to receive their next clue.

In this leg's Roadblock, one team member to dig to find one of four barreados (boiled pieces of meat) in sixty holes to receive their next clue.

Additional task
Before the Detour, teams had to learn and participate in a traditional Ukrainian folk dance to receive their next clue.

Leg 12 (Paraná → Chile)

Airdate: December 29, 2007
 Curitiba (Afonso Pena International Airport) to Santiago, Chile (Arturo Merino Benítez International Airport)
Santiago (Chile.com Office)
Santiago (Mall del Centro)
 Santiago (Plaza de Armas or Mercado Central)
 (Funicular de Santiago) Santiago (Cerro San Cristóbal – Virgin Mary Statue)
Santiago (Home of Pablo Neruda)
 Santiago (Diego's Bar and Grill, Libreria Chilena, and Library of Congress of Chile)
Vitacura (Valle Nevado) 

This leg's Detour was a choice between Limpar Botas (Clean Boots) or Limpar Peixes (Clean Fish). In Limpar Botas, teams had to go to the Plaza de Armas and shine six pairs of shoes, charging 300 pesos for each, to receive their next clue. In Limpar Peixes, teams had to transport ten fish in the Mercado Central, gut, skin and fillet four of them, and eat one sea urchin each to receive their next clue.

In this leg's Roadblock, one team member to get a book autographed by Pablo Neruda at a nearby bar, then make their way to Libreria Chilena, where they had to load 150 books onto a hand truck and deliver them to Chile's Library of Congress to receive their next clue.

Additional task
At the Chile.com office, teams received video messages from their loved ones at home.

Leg 13 (Chile)

Airdate: January 5, 2008
 Santiago (Arturo Merino Benítez International Airport) to Puerto Montt, Los Lagos Region (El Tepual Airport)
Puerto Montt (Angelmó Market)
 Ancud, Chiloé Island (Cabañas Gaviotas) (Overnight Rest)
Dalcahue, Chiloé Island (Farm near San Juan) 
Dalcahue (San Juan Fishing Village)
Dalcahue (San Juan Central Plaza) 
Dalcahue (San Juan Overlook) 

In this season's final Roadblock, one team member had to carry crates filled with apples and crush 1000 apples using farm equipment to receive their next clue.

This season's final Detour was a choice between Casa (House) or Concha (Shell). In Casa, teams had to haul a mobile home out of the lake with the help of two bulls to receive their next clue. In Concha, teams had to pull four clam cages out of the water and retrieve 100 clams to receive their next clue.

Additional tasks
At Angelmó Market, teams had to each eat  of smoked clams. Failure to complete this task would result in disqualification. After that, teams then had to carry a small wooden house from the market to Calle Las Queimas to receive their next clue.
At the fishing village, teams had to paint a boat frame and carry a canoe to the central plaza to receive their next clue.

References

External links
Official website 

Brazil
2007 Brazilian television series debuts
2008 Brazilian television series endings
Brazilian reality television series
Brazilian television series based on American television series
RedeTV! original programming
Television shows filmed in Brazil
Television shows filmed in Chile
Television shows set in South America